Najibullah Khwaja Omary is a politician and current minister of higher education in Afghanistan. He was appointed as head of ministry in place of Abdul Latif Roshan on 22 November 2017.

Early life 
Najibullah Khwaja Omari was born in 1955 in Afghanistan in Khwaja Umari District of Ghazni province. Najibullah Khwaja Omari is an ethnic Ghazni.

References 

1955 births
Living people
Hazara politicians
Politicians of Ghazni Province